The Guadeloupean League of Football (French: Ligue Guadeloupéenne de Football) is the governing body of football in Guadeloupe.

See also
Guadeloupe Division d'Honneur
Guadeloupe national football team

References

External links
 Guadalupe on Concacaf

Guadeloupe
Football in Guadeloupe
Guad
Sports organizations established in 1958
1958 establishments in Guadeloupe